Kishan Lal (2 February 1917 – 23 June 1980) was an Indian field hockey player. He captained the Indian hockey team in 1948, which won its first gold at the Olympics as an independent country, defeating Great Britain in the final, 4–0.

Introduction
Kishan Lal was India's hockey team captain at the 1948 Olympics in London. He is considered one of the greatest inside forwards in field hockey. He is known as the fastest player in the wing position and a gentlemanly player. According to Gian Singh, "Many times, I would think he would score but invariable he would pass the ball to inside forwards or the center forward to do the finishing touch."

Career

The beginning
He was born in Mhow. He started playing hockey at the age of 14. In 1933, he represented Mhow Heroes and Mhow Green Walls and played for Kalyanmal Mills, Indore. In 1937, he joined the Bhagwant Club of Tikamgarh.

He was selected for the 1940 Olympic team.

In 1941, he joined BB & CI Railway. He played for Central India in the National Hockey Championship. Under his Captaincy, the team won three championships in a row.

1948 Olympics 
Kishan Lal was named captain of the Indian squad for the 1948 London Olympics . India's won against Austria by 8-0. After a 9–1 win over Argentina, then Spain, in the final game, 2–0. Lal won against Netherlands in the semifinal and final against Great Britain, which India won by 4-0. Lal was rated by The Times as an "outstanding forward on the field".

As coach

After 28 years of career, he retired from competitive hockey but remained connected with the game until 1976 as Chief Coach under the Railways Sports Control Board. He was a chief coach for Indian Railways for twenty years out of which Indian Railways won the National Tournament fourteen times while the rest six ended as draws in the Finals. In 1964, he was invited to train in Malaysia. In 1968, he was invited to coach East Germany.

Death
He died on 23 June 1980. He was cremated at the Sion Crematorium in Bombay.

Awards
In 1966, he was awarded with the prestigious Padma Shri by former President of India Dr Sarvapalli Radha Krishnan.

Personal life
Kishan Lal had four sons and a daughter. His eldest son, Devki Lal, was a hockey coach. Devki died on September 21, 2009.

See also
List of Indian hockey captains in Olympics
Field hockey in India
India men's national field hockey team

References

External links
 
 Bharatiya Hockey

1917 births
1980 deaths
Olympic field hockey players of India
Field hockey players at the 1948 Summer Olympics
Indian male field hockey players
Olympic gold medalists for India
Recipients of the Padma Shri in sports
Field hockey players from Madhya Pradesh
Olympic medalists in field hockey
People from Mhow
Medalists at the 1948 Summer Olympics
Indian field hockey coaches